The Ruth Meiers Hospitality House, Inc. is a shelter for the homeless located in Bismarck, North Dakota. It was founded in 1987 and is named after Ruth Meiers, the first woman Lieutenant Governor of North Dakota. The first home was leased from HUD for $1 and has grown from a 7-person to a 210-bed shelter with 110 affordable housing units.

Programs
The Women with Children and Single Women's Emergency Shelter 
The Men's Emergency Shelter
New Beginnings 
Horizons

Supplemental services
The Stone Soup Kitchen 
Joanne’s Healthcare 
The Drop-In Center
Educational Services 
The Baby Boutique
The Used Furniture Barn
The Food Pantry
Single Point of Entry

External links
Ruth Meiers Hospitality House website

Women's shelters in the United States
Organizations established in 1987
1987 establishments in North Dakota
Women in North Dakota
Buildings and structures in Bismarck, North Dakota